No. 20 Squadron is the Royal Air Force's Operational Conversion Unit (OCU) for ground-based Tactical Air Command and Control, and Air Battle Management.  It is part of the RAF's Air Surveillance and Control System (ASACS) and is based at RAF Boulmer. It was allocated the role on 1 June 2021.

The squadron had previously been a flying squadron.  In its last role, it was the Operational Conversion Unit for the UK's Joint Force Harrier; from September 1992 until March 2010 the squadron operated the BAE Harrier  at RAF Wittering.

History

World War I
The squadron was formed on 1 September 1915 at Netheravon, Wiltshire, as part of the Royal Flying Corps. In 1915, the German, and French and British air services had increasingly fought each other in the air for control of the skies to conduct reconnaissance.  Combined with an expansion of the British Army, this prompted an expansion of the Royal Flying Corps in the second half of 1915, during which 20 Squadron was formed from a nucleus of Number 7 Reserve Aeroplane Squadron under the command of Captain C W Wilson MC.

The squadron flew to France on 16 January 1916 landing first at St Omer and moving the following week to Clairmarais. It was equipped with the FE2B two-seat fighter-reconnaissance aircraft, which were replaced in June 1916 by the FE2D model, with an improved engine and armament.  No. 20 Squadron was part of the Royal Flying Corps’ 2nd Brigade, working with the British 2nd Army, whose area of operations was around Ypres.  The squadron's tasks included offensive patrols, photography, reconnaissance, and bombing by day and night.

Of the squadron's 628 claimed combat victories, over 460 were confirmed by appearance in RFC Official Communiques. One of the combat victories that was most notable was that accredited to Second Lieutenant Woodbridge on 6 July 1917, who was the first British airman to wound Manfred von Richthofen when a 20 Squadron patrol was attacked by Richttofen's Jagdgeschwader 1.

The skill and courage exhibited by members of 20 Squadron throughout the war was reflected in 71 gallantry awards. In addition to 34 Military Crosses, 19 Distinguished Flying Crosses, five Military Medals and other decorations, a Victoria Cross was posthumously awarded to Acting Flight Sergeant Thomas Mottershead, who died as a result of injuries sustained in combat on 7 January 1917.

The squadron continued to operate from the St Omer area in support of the British Army around Ypres for most of the war, at airfields such as Boisdinghem and Saint Marie Cappel.  On 21 September 1917, it completed its re-equipment with the replacement for the FE2D, the Bristol Fighter, which was to equip the squadron for the next 15 years. The squadron conducted daily detached operations from Bruay, near Bethune during the major German offensive in March 1918, and moved further south to several airfields east of Amiens as allied armies moved forward during the 100 Days Offensive.

The squadron transferred from the Royal Flying Corps to the newly formed Royal Air Force in April 1918. After the Armistice, 20 Squadron moved to Ossogne, east of Namur in Belgium, where it stayed until May 1919.

The Northwest Frontier 
After the Afghan Army invaded the Northwest Frontier province of India in early May 1919, 20 Squadron was ordered to sail for India as reinforcement for the two squadrons already in place.  They were to conduct similar air operations to those that they had undertaken on the Western Front in support of the Army.

The squadron arrived at RAF Risalpur on 19 June 1919 and was the first squadron to fly the Bristol Fighter in India. Although the Afghan invasion had been defeated, 20 Squadron was retained on the Northwest Frontier in the new role of Air Control. For most of the next 20 years, the Squadron was mainly based at RAF Peshawar, with regular moves forward to locations such as Miranshah and Shabkadar.

The squadron developed new techniques of Air Control. Their Bristol fighters conducted reconnaissance, both independently and for the Army in the field.

The squadron also undertook more peaceful and humanitarian roles. Two Wapitis, on trial in India and flown by 20 Squadron crews, escorted the RAF Victoria and DH9s conducting the Kabul airlift of 1929. They were the only aircraft on the North-West Frontier equipped with Wireless Telephony sets, which were used to maintain contact with Peshawar during the operation. It responded to the large earthquake which hit Quetta on 31 May 1935; the squadron deployed 9 aircraft to ferry medical personnel and supplies to and around the area.  It also flew vaccine to Kabul on 19 August 1936.

In August 1928, the famous archaeologist, diplomat, army officer and writer T E Lawrence was posted to 20 Squadron, having joined the RAF as a non-commissioned airman.  He served as a clerk at the squadron forward airfield at Miranshah until press stories emerged in London that he was conducting diplomacy and espionage in Afghanistan.  As such news was likely to disturb the local political situation, he was posted away from 20 Squadron on 8 January 1929, returning to the UK.

In 1932, 20 Squadron exchanged its Bristol Fighters for Westland Wapitis and these, in turn, were exchanged for Hawker Audaxes in December 1935.

World War II
During the opening period of the Second World War, 20 Squadron continued its air control work on the Northwest Frontier.  After Italy's entry to the war, defence of India's ports was assigned a higher priority; on 14 February 1941 A and B Flights moved to Bombay and Madras respectively to provide reconnaissance and attack for coastal defence.  These flights re-joined the rest of the squadron at its new headquarters at RAF Secunderabad on 10 June 1941. It was re-equipped with Westland Lysanders in December 1941, remaining in the army co-operation role.  After Japan's entry to the war on 7 December 1941, Japan attacked Burma in early 1942, forcing British forces to retreat towards India.  20 Squadron was moved closer to the Burmese front at RAF Jamshedpur on 1 May 1942 via a short stay at its previous home at RAF Peshawar.

For the remainder of 1942, the squadron was headquartered at Jamshedpur, moving 70 miles north to RAF Chharra in during December 1942 and remaining there until May 1943.  During this time, the squadron continued to fly its Lysander aircraft in support of the Army on the Burmese front.  Although the Lysanders were old, somewhat unreliable and short of spare parts, 20 Squadron maintained detachments at Imphal and Chittagong. Often unescorted, 20 Squadron Lysanders conducted armed reconnaissance and attack missions in Arakan, and in support of Chindit raiding activities in the Chindwin River Valley; they would fly at or below treetop height to avoid detection when Japanese fighters were nearby.  The Flight at Chittagong also conducted some Air-Sea Rescue missions.  In May 1943, 20 Squadron exchanged their Lysanders for Hurricane IIDs ; this variant of the Hurricane was armed with two 40mm underwing cannons designed specifically for destroying tanks and armoured vehicles.  The squadron moved to RAF Kalyan, near Bombay, for training on the new aircraft. The monsoon delayed completion of this training and it was December 1943 before the squadron was ready to move back into the line at Nidania.

For the next 7 months, 20 Squadron operated in turn from Nidania (codenamed ‘George’), Madhaibunia (codenamed ‘Hove’) and Chiringa, all in the North-West of Burma.  As the only squadron equipped with Hurricane IIDs in country, its primary targets were enemy armour, although most attacks were carried out against lines of communication, such as river boats and trucks.  In April 1944, 20 Squadron detached a Flt to Lankipatti to fly anti-tank sorties during the Battle of Imphal.

The squadron moved to RAF Trichinopoly in July 1944, and RAF St Thomas Mount (now Chennai International Airport) outside Madras in September 1944 for rest, recuperation and further training.  During the latter months of 1944, it also provided a detachment to Imphal to undertake aerial spraying with Hurricanes to minimise the spread of malaria.

In December 1944, A Flt converted to the Rocket-Projectile-armed Hurricane IV, before the squadron moved to a series of airfields in the central lowlands as Allied armies advanced rapidly through Mandalay, Meiktila and on to Rangoon, again attacking Lines of Communication and enemy strongpoints, such as bunkers.  After Rangoon was captured on 2 May, 20 Squadron was stood down from operations on 8 May 1945 and moved back to RAF St Thomas Mount.  The squadron was preparing for a move to the Far East when the Second World War came to an end.

Cold War (1945-1970)
In August and September 1945, 20 Squadron moved from RAF St Thomas Mount to RAF Amarda Road, where they re-equipped with Spitfire VIIIs before moving to Don Muang, outside Bangkok, as the first RAF squadron based in Siam, now Thailand.  The squadron exchanged its Spitfire VIIIs for Spitfire XIVs in December 1945.  By April 1946, the squadron had moved to RAF Agra and re-equipped with Tempest FBII, which it retained until its disbandment on 1 August 1947, two weeks before Indian independence. From 1949 to 1951, 20 Squadron was reformed from No 631 Squadron at RAF Llanbedr flying a variety of aircraft in the Anti-Aircraft Cooperation role, providing targets for AAA guns and simulating attacks on ground troops for their training. It moved to RAF Valley in July 1949, disbanding in September 1951.

The expansion of the RAF in Germany, as part of the increased tension between NATO and the Soviet Union and its satellites, led to the re-formation of 20 Squadron in June 1952 at RAF Jever operating the Vampire FB9 in the air defence and ground attack roles. In late July 1952, 20 Squadron moved to the re-constructed airfield at RAF Oldenburg.  In order to counter the threat from the new Soviet Mig-15, the squadron re-equipped with Canadair Sabre F4s in 1953. In November 1955 it again re-equipped with the Hawker Hunter F4, which was superseded by the Hunter F6 in May 1957. The squadron disbanded on 20 December 1960, but its ‘numberplate’ was allocated to the RAF's Far East Air Force (FEAF) for future use.

In 1960 the SEATO organisation's concerns about the situation in South-East Asia led to the Royal Air Force bolstering its presence in the area.  20 Squadron was reformed, equipped with the Hunter FGA9, a specialist ground-attack version of the aircraft.  The pilots of the reformed squadron collected their aircraft from the UK and flew them to RAF Tengah, Singapore, with the squadron fully in place by November 1960. For the next 10 years, 20 Squadron remained based at Tengah.  Routine training in Singapore and Malaysia maintained proficiency in its various roles, while detachments took place at various times to Hong Kong, Don Muang, Korat and Butterworth.  During the Indonesian Confrontation, the squadron deployed aircraft to Labuan and Kuching providing attack and air defence against incursions into Malaysia by land, sea and air.  20 Squadron established a new Flight in 1969, when 209 Squadron at RAF Seletar disbanded, absorbing three of its Pioneer STOL aircraft for Forward Air Control duties in support of its Hunters. In 1968, the British government announced it would withdraw from ‘East of Suez’ by 1971, which led to the disbandment of 20 Squadron in February 1970.

The Cold War (1970-1992) 
20 Squadron reformed in Germany on 1 December 1970 as the second Harrier GR1 squadron based at RAF Wildenrath. It was declared to NATO in an offensive support role and re-equipped with the Harrier GR3 in 1975.  This update introduced laser ranging and target marking equipment in the nose of the aircraft and a Radar Warning Receiver. Two years later, the RAF decided to rationalise its Harrier squadrons in Germany by sharing all Harrier aircraft between two, rather than three, squadrons, and 20 Squadron was selected to hand over its Harriers to No. 4 Squadron at RAF Gütersloh at the end of February 1977.

It reformed the following day at RAF Brüggen, equipped with the twelve Jaguar GR1, again providing offensive support to NATO forces in West Germany.  In addition to its conventional weapons, the squadron had eight WE.177 tactical nuclear bombs for use if a future European conflict escalated to the use of nuclear weapons. The apparent mismatch between eight nuclear bombs and twelve aircraft was because RAF staff planners expected up to one third attrition in the initial conventional phase, with sufficient aircraft held back in reserve to deliver the full stock of nuclear weapons to targets beyond the forward edge of the battlefield, deep into the enemy's rear areas. The squadron was assigned to NATO for operational and targeting purposes, although political control over release of the British-owned WE.177 weapons was retained by the British government in London.

On 30 June 1984, 20 Squadron re-equipped with the Tornado GR1 at RAF Laarbruch, retaining its offensive support role and increasing its stock of WE.177 nuclear weapons to 18, due to the Tornado's greater payload.

In November 1990, the squadron deployed to RSAF Tabuk, Saudi Arabia, as part of the RAF's contribution to Operation Granby, the British name for its part in the Gulf War of 1991. The squadron was responsible for attacks on Iraqi airfields at low- and medium-levels, and also introduced the new ALARM anti-radiation missile into operational service. 20 Squadron returned to RAF Laarbruch in March 1991.

As part of the British Government's Options for Change Defence Review, the RAF reduced its number of bases in Germany from four to two;  part of this reduction involved the disbandment of 20 Squadron as a Tornado Squadron on 31 July 1992.

Operational Conversion Unit (1992-2010)

On 1 September 1992 the Harrier No. 233 Operational Conversion Unit RAF at Wittering was renumbered No 20 (Reserve) Squadron.  The ‘Reserve’ title indicated that, although the squadron was not a front-line unit, its staff, aircraft and equipment could be used for operations should the need arise.

On 1 April 2000, 20 Squadron and the other Royal Air Force Harrier and Royal Navy Sea Harrier squadrons were brought under the control of Joint Force Harrier. The squadron remained at RAF Wittering for the next ten years.  In 2010, Joint Force Harrier was reduced by one squadron.  IV (AC) Squadron was disbanded as a frontline squadron but, as it had greater seniority, its number was assigned to the OCU as IV (Reserve) Squadron which led to 20 Squadron's disbandment on 31 March 2010. Joint Force Harrier's disbandment unexpectedly followed as part of the Strategic Defence and Security Review which was published on 19 October 2010.

ASACS training (2021 – present) 
On 1 June 2021, the squadron number plate was allocated to the RAF's Air Surveillance and Control System (ASACS) Operational Conversion Unit (OCU) based at RAF Boulmer in Northumberland. The ASACS OCU provides basic and advanced air battle management training to British Armed Forces personnel whose role it is to monitor, detect and identify all aircraft in and around UK airspace; and coordinate Quick Reaction Alert aircraft tasked by the UK or NATO.

Aircraft operated 

 Royal Aircraft Factory F.E.2B
 Bristol F.2 Fighter
 Westland Wapiti
 Hawker Audax
 Westland Lysander
 Hawker Hurricane
 Supermarine Spitfire

 Hawker Tempest
 de Havilland Vampire
 Canadair Sabre
 Hawker Hunter
 Hawker Siddeley Harrier
 SEPECAT Jaguar
 Panavia Tornado

See also
List of Royal Air Force aircraft squadrons

References

020 Squadron
020 Squadron
Military units and formations established in 1915
Military units and formations of the Gulf War
1915 establishments in the United Kingdom